Lasse Stefanz Goes 70's is a 2010 Lasse Stefanz studio album, and a tribute to music of the 1970s, the decade the band climbed towards the charts. All songs are performed in English, and are duets performed together with different artists.

Track listing

Chart positions

Certifications

References 

2010 albums
Lasse Stefanz albums